Akdarı may refer to:

 Akdarı, Çıldır, village in Ardahan Province, Turkey
 Erdal Akdarı, Turkish footballer

Turkish-language surnames